Hom Shali Bugh Assembly constituency is one of the 87 constituencies in the Jammu and Kashmir Legislative Assembly of Jammu and Kashmir a north state of India. Hom Shali Bugh is also part of Anantnag Lok Sabha constituency.

Members of Legislative Assembly

Election results

2014

See also 
 Hom Shali Bugh
 List of constituencies of Jammu and Kashmir Legislative Assembly

References 

Assembly constituencies of Jammu and Kashmir
Kulgam district